James Harlan is a bronze sculpture of the American attorney and politician of the same name by Nellie Walker, formerly installed in Washington, D.C.'s United States Capitol, as part of the National Statuary Hall Collection. The statue, which was gifted by the U.S. state of Iowa in 1910, was replaced with one portraying Norman Borlaug in 2014.

The statue is now on display on the campus of Iowa Wesleyan University.

References

External links
 

1910 sculptures
Bronze sculptures in Iowa
Harlan
Iowa Wesleyan University
Outdoor sculptures in Iowa
Sculptures of men in Iowa
Statues in Iowa